Ploiaria is a cosmopolitan genus of thread-legged bugs (Emesinae). There are presently about 130 described species.

Description 
Ploiaria can be recognised by the head without ventral spine-like setae, the medially emarginated posterior margin of the prosternum, the posterior pronotal lobe covering only the extreme base of the mesonotum, the scutellum and metanotum lacking spines, the profemora lacking a process with several spine-like setae, and three-segmented protarsi. There is great variation in wing development between different species and within species, with macroptery (developed wings), brachyptery (reduced wings) and aptery (winglessness) all occurring in the genus.

Habitat 
These bugs live in various habitats ranging from tropical forests to deserts and even oceanic islands (presumably reached by rafting on tree trunks). Their microhabitat range includes trees, epiphytes, leaf litter, under bark and under stones. The species P. chilensis and P. domestica are synanthropes, meaning they are associated with human habitats.

Diet 
Ploiaria, like other emesines, are predators. They have been recorded feeding on prey such as Phlebotomus flies, mosquitoes and planthoppers.

Selected species
This list contains all species of Ploiaria currently considered valid, except for a few that have been described very recently:

 Ploiaria abrupta Noualhier, 1895
 Ploiaria albipennis McAtee & Malloch, 1925
 Ploiaria alexanderi Wygodzinsky, 1954
 Ploiaria anak Distant, 1909
 Ploiaria antipoda Bergroth, 1927
 Ploiaria apicata McAtee & Malloch, 1926
 Ploiaria aptera McAtee & Malloch, 1925
 Ploiaria armstrongi Wygodzinsky, 1956
 Ploiaria assimilata Van Duzee, 1935
 Ploiaria bakeri McAtee & Malloch, 1926
 Ploiaria basilewskyi Villiers, 1961
 Ploiaria bequaerti Wygodzinsky, 1953
 Ploiaria berlandi Villiers, 1943
 Ploiaria biroi Wygodzinsky, 1966
 Ploiaria borbonica Villiers, 1971
 Ploiaria brincki Wygodzinsky, 1958
 Ploiaria brunnea McAtee & Malloch, 1925
 Ploiaria buscki Wygodzinsky, 1925
 Ploiaria californiensis Baker, 1910
 Ploiaria capeneri Wygodzinsky, 1952
 Ploiaria capensis Villiers, 1949
 Ploiaria carolina (Herrich-Schaeffer, 1850)
 Ploiaria carvalhoi Wygodzinsky, 1966
 Ploiaria chilensis (Philippi, 1862)
 Ploiaria circe (Kirkaldy, 1908)
 Ploiaria concolor (Dohrn, 1860)
 Ploiaria congoana (Villiers, 1949)
 Ploiaria cunnamulla Wygodzinsky, 1956
 Ploiaria darlingtoni Wygodzinsky, 1954
 Ploiaria decorata Villiers, 1950
 Ploiaria denieri Wygodzinsky, 1954
 Ploiaria denticauda McAtee & Malloch, 1925
 Ploiaria disponsi Linnavuori, 1965
 Ploiaria djurdjurana Dispons, 1951
 Ploiaria domestica Scopoli, 1786
 Ploiaria elegantula Villiers, 1952
 Ploiaria ellenbergeri Villiers, 1948
 Ploiaria fairmairei (Dohrn, 1860)
 Ploiaria floridana (Bergroth, 1922)
 Ploiaria funebris (Bergroth, 1906)
 Ploiaria gabonensis (Villiers, 1948)
 Ploiaria geijskesi Wygodzinsky, 1945
 Ploiaria geniculata (Stål, 1874)
 Ploiaria glabella Wygodzinsky, 1966
 Ploiaria gracilipes Villiers, 1973
 Ploiaria granulata McAtee & Malloch, 1925
 Ploiaria greeni Distant, 1903
 Ploiaria guadeloupensis Villiers, 1978
 Ploiaria gundlachi (Dohrn, 1860)
 Ploiaria guttata Wygodzinsky, 1956
 Ploiaria gutturalis Noualhier, 1895
 Ploiaria hainana Hsiao, 1965
 Ploiaria halosydne Wygodzinsky & Usinger, 1960
 Ploiaria hewitti China, 1925
 Ploiaria hirticornis (N.Banks, 1909)
 Ploiaria icela Wygodzinsky, 1958
 Ploiaria insolida White, 1877
 Ploiaria isadas (Kirkaldy, 1901)
 Ploiaria jimmiwum Wygodzinsky, 1966
 Ploiaria katznelsoni (Dispons, 1964)
 Ploiaria kocheri Dispons, 1963
 Ploiaria lestoni (Villiers, 1967)
 Ploiaria longa Maldonado, 1972
 Ploiaria longiventris (Dohrn, 1863)
 Ploiaria maai Wygodzinsky, 1966
 Ploiaria macrophthalma (Dohrn, 1860)
 Ploiaria maria Maldonado, 1948
 Ploiaria matilei Dispons & Villiers, 1967
 Ploiaria maya Wygodzinsky, 1966
 Ploiaria media McAtee & Malloch, 1926
 Ploiaria megalops (Champion, 1898)
 Ploiaria mellea McAtee & Malloch, 1926
 Ploiaria metapterina
 Ploiaria mimeuri Villiers, 1943
 Ploiaria modesta Montrouzier, 1865
 Ploiaria montivaga Dispons, 1963
 Ploiaria mosconai Wygodzinsky, 1952
 Ploiaria moshesh Wygodzinsky, 1958
 Ploiaria musgravei Wygodzinsky, 1956
 Ploiaria nilotica Villiers, 1973
 Ploiaria nitida McAtee & Malloch, 1925
 Ploiaria noualhieri Villiers, 1943
 Ploiaria obscura Wygodzinsky, 1956
 Ploiaria oculata (Villiers, 1949)
 Ploiaria pallida Montrouzier, 1855
 Ploiaria palmarum Maldonado, 1974
 Ploiaria paveli
 Ploiaria penai Wygodzinsky, 1954
 Ploiaria phyllodoce Wygodzinsky & Usinger, 1960
 Ploiaria pilicornis McAtee & Malloch, 1925
 Ploiaria plaumanni Wygodzinsky, 1966
 Ploiaria poncei Maldonado, 1948
 Ploiaria praedator (Champion, 1898)
 Ploiaria praesentans (Distant, 1909)
 Ploiaria punctipes McAtee & Malloch, 1925
 Ploiaria putoni Noualhier, 1895
 Ploiaria recta McAtee & Malloch, 1926
 Ploiaria regina Wygodzinsky, 1956
 Ploiaria reticulata (Baker, 1910)
 Ploiaria rufoannulata (Bergroth, 1911)
 Ploiaria sachtlebeni Villiers, 1948
 Ploiaria sefrana Dispons, 1960
 Ploiaria setulifera McAtee & Malloch, 1925
 Ploiaria sexdentata Lindberg, 1932
 Ploiaria sicaria McAtee & Malloch, 1925
 Ploiaria similis McAtee & Malloch, 1925
 Ploiaria sonoraensis (Van Duzee, 1923)
 Ploiaria soudanica Dispons, 1960
 Ploiaria speluncaria Villiers, 1979
 Ploiaria stysi
 Ploiaria texana N.Banks, 1909
 Ploiaria thetis Wygodzinsky & Usinger, 1960
 Ploiaria tibestina Villiers, 1982
 Ploiaria tillandsiacola Maldonado & Brailovsky, 1983
 Ploiaria tuberculata Villiers, 1949
 Ploiaria turkestanica Putshkov, 1984
 Ploiaria ultima McAtee & Malloch, 1966
 Ploiaria umbrarum McAtee & Malloch, 1925
 Ploiaria uniseriata McAtee & Malloch, 1925
 Ploiaria vandoesburgi Redei, 2008
 Ploiaria varipennis McAtee & Malloch, 1925
 Ploiaria villiersi Maldonado, 1978
 Ploiaria vincenti (Villiers, 1966)
 Ploiaria wahrmani Wygodzinsky, 1952
 Ploiaria woodwardi Wygodzinsky, 1956
 Ploiaria yunquensis Maldonado, 1948

References

 http://www.discoverlife.org/nh/tx/Insecta/Hemiptera/Reduviidae/OTHER/species_list.Weirauch,_Christiane.20060306.org

Reduviidae
Cimicomorpha genera
Taxa named by Giovanni Antonio Scopoli